A Sutra is a kind of text in Hinduism, Buddhism and Jainism. Sutra or Sutras may also refer to:

Scomi SUTRA, the Mumbai monorail system
Sutra (newspaper), a Serbian newspaper published for two months in 2007
Sutras (album), a 1996 album by Scottish singer/songwriter Donovan
Sistema Único de Trámite Legislativo (SUTRA), the legislative information database of the Legislative Assembly of Puerto Rico
 a condom brand sold by DKT International

See also 
Sutrah, a barrier used in prayer in Islam
Sura, a division of the Quran in Islam
Suture (disambiguation)